The Pune–Kazipet Weekly Superfast Express is a Superfast train belonging to Central Railway zone that runs between  and  in India. It is currently being operated with 22151/22152 train numbers on a weekly basis.

Service 

The 22151/Pune–Kazipet Weekly Superfast Express has average speed of 57 km/hr and covers 1178 km in 20h 50m. The 22152/Kazipet–Pune Weekly Superfast Express has average speed of 55 km/hr and covers 1178 km in 21h 35m.

Route and halts 

The halts of the train are:

Coach composition

The train has standard ICF rakes with maximum speed of 110 kmph. The train consists of 20 coaches:

 1 AC 2 Tier 
 5 AC 3 Tier
 8 Sleeper 
 4 General Unreserved
 2 Seating cum Luggage

Traction 

Both trains are hauled by a Bhusawal Loco Shed or Lallaguda Loco Shed-based WAP-4 electric locomotive from Pune to Kazipet and vice versa.

See also 

 Pune Junction railway station
 Kazipet Junction railway station

Notes

References

External links 

 22151/Pune - Kazipet Weekly Superfast Express India Rail Info
 22152/Kazipet - Pune Weekly Superfast Express India Rail Info

Express trains in India
Transport in Pune
Hanamkonda district
Rail transport in Maharashtra
Rail transport in Telangana
Railway services introduced in 2017